Carlos Domingos Duarte (25 March 1933 – 23 August 2022) was a Portuguese footballer who played as a forward for Porto and the Portugal national team.

International career 
Duarte gained seven caps and scored one goal for the Portugal national team. He made his debut against South Africa on 21 November 1953 in Lisbon in a 3–1 win.

Honours 
Porto
 Portuguese championship: 1955–56, 1958–59
 Cup of Portugal: 1955–56, 1957–58

References

External links 
 
 

1933 births
2022 deaths
People from Huambo
Portuguese sportspeople of Angolan descent
Portuguese footballers
Angolan footballers
Association football forwards
Portugal international footballers
Primeira Liga players
FC Porto players
Leixões S.C. players